The Volkswagen ID. Vizzion is  a concept electric vehicle, part of Volkswagen's ID. project. The firm is planning to sell a production version of the vehicle by 2022. It should be expected that some of the claims of the Vizzion Concept, such as the autonomous level 5 driving, will very likely not make it the final 2022 production version of the vehicle. The Vizzion Concept is more likely to represent what driving in the year 2030 could be like.

Technical statistics 

The Vizzion Concept has an all-wheel drive system, powered by the electric motors on the front and back of the vehicle for a combined total of 302 hp. The car would be equipped with sensors that aid in the user experience (such as a 360 degree camera and a facial recognition system) as well as allow the car to drive autonomously. The headlights include 8,000 HD Matrix LEDs, allowing the car to "communicate with the outside world by projecting the image of crosswalk lines in front of the I.D. VIZZION to let pedestrians know they can safely pass in front."

Design 
The Vizzion Concept's design was aimed to eliminate any seams or obstructions for passengers. It features rear-opening doors and windows that lie flush with the body-work of the car, thus giving the car a futuristic look. The vehicle also features several LED strips that surround the car, highlighting the front grille, the door handles, rear fenders and the sides. The lights on the car start pulsating to let the user know that the car has detected one of its passengers' faces using integrated sensors. The interior features only two analog dials: they are multi-functional, but are primarily for adjusting the stereo. The majority of car functions are controlled through hand gestures in the heads-up display and voice controls. The car features no steering wheel or any dashboard, as the car is level 5 autonomous.

Volkswagen claims that the technology for the car is "much closer than you think", either already existing or under development by Volkswagen.

Vizzion production vehicle (2023-2024) 
Little is known about details and design the production version of the vehicle. The majority of information comes from official Volkswagen statements. Volkswagen says that they are aiming to start production of a toned down, more production ready version of the Vizzion in 2022, and that it will not include level 5 autonomous driving. Volkswagen also confirms that they are following through with the 302 hp, 111-kWh battery, and the 400 mile range figures of their original concept.

See also
 Volkswagen ID. Space Vizzion – a related wagon
 Volkswagen ID. series

References 

2020s cars
Electric concept cars
Sedans
ID. Vizzion
Experimental self-driving cars
Cars introduced in 2019